Wealth is a 1921 American silent drama film directed by William Desmond Taylor, written by Cosmo Hamilton and Julia Crawford Ivers, and starring Ethel Clayton, Herbert Rawlinson, J.M. Dumont, Larry Steers, George Periolat, and Claire McDowell. It was released on August 21, 1921, by Paramount Pictures. It is not known whether the film currently survives, and it may be a lost film.

Plot
As described in a film magazine, artist Mary McLeod (Clayton) meets Phillip Dominick (Rawlinson), the son of a wealthy woman, on a Pullman car on a train bound for the city. When she informs the conductor that she has left her purse behind, Phillip magnanimously gives up his stateroom for her. The chance acquaintance ripens to love and they get married. The match does not meet the approval of Phillip's mother (McDowell), and when they go to live with her, she makes life almost unbearable for Mary. The wife also becomes disgusted at the idle life led by her husband. Then a baby is born to them. Phillip goes on a camping trip, and while he is absent the child dies. Upon his return Mary decides to leave him. Phillip follows her to her studio and announces that his mother's money has been a curse. He swears that he will be a man from then on, and Mary knows happiness lies ahead for them.

Cast 
Ethel Clayton as Mary McLeod
Herbert Rawlinson as Phillip Dominick
J.M. Dumont as Gordon Townsend
Larry Steers as Oliver Marshall
George Periolat as Irving Seaton
Claire McDowell as Mrs. Dominick
Jean Acker as Estelle Rolland
Richard Wayne as Dr. Howard

References

External links 

 
 

1921 films
1920s English-language films
Silent American drama films
1921 drama films
Paramount Pictures films
Films directed by William Desmond Taylor
American silent feature films
American black-and-white films
1920s American films